Zakia Shahnawaz Khan (born 5 March 1946) is a Pakistani politician  who was the member of Provincial Assembly of the Punjab between 1977 and May 2018.

Early life and education
Khan was born on 5 March 1946 in Isakhel.

She received her education from St Denys High School, Murree and Queen Mary College, Lahore and completed matriculation level education.

Political career

Khan was elected to the Provincial Assembly of the Punjab on a reserved seat for women in 1977 Pakistani general election.

She was re-elected to the Provincial Assembly of the Punjab on a reserved seat for women in 1985 Pakistani general election.

She was re-elected to the Provincial Assembly of the Punjab as a candidate of Pakistan Muslim League (N) (PML-N) on a reserved seat for women in 2013 Pakistani general election. In June 2013, she was inducted into the provincial Punjab cabinet of Chief Minister Shehbaz Sharif and was made Provincial Minister of Punjab for Population Welfare. In November 2016, she was made Provincial Minister of Punjab for environment protection.

She was re-elected to the Provincial Assembly of the Punjab as a candidate of PML-N on a reserved seat for women in 2018 Pakistani general election.

References

Living people
Women members of the Provincial Assembly of the Punjab
Punjab MPAs 2013–2018
1946 births
Pakistan Muslim League (N) MPAs (Punjab)
Punjab MPAs 1985–1988
21st-century Pakistani women politicians